Driesh (Gaelic: Dris) is a mountain located in the Grampians of Scotland.  Apart from Mount Keen (939 m/3,080 ft), it is the most easterly of the Munro peaks.

Located several miles north of the town of Kirriemuir in Angus, the closeness of Driesh to the city of Dundee makes it a popular Munro with locals; in many ways making it the Dundonian equivalent to Ben Lomond near Glasgow.

References

Munros
Mountains and hills of the Eastern Highlands
Mountains and hills of Angus, Scotland